Anne Wignall, known as Lady Ebury (née Acland-Troyte; 12 June 1912 – 23 June 1982), was an English socialite and author as Alice Acland and Anne Marreco.

Family life
Anne Wignall was born Anne Acland-Troyte in the London Borough of Kensington, the daughter of Herbert Walter Acland-Troyte and Marjorie Florence Pym. She had one younger brother, John Acland-Troyte.

She married:
On 1 July 1933, Baron Ebury (1914-1957). They had two sons, Francis Egerton Grosvenor, 8th Earl of Wilton (born 1934) and the Hon. Robert Victor Grosvenor (1936–1993). They were divorced in 1941. During their marriage they lived at Redheath (now York House School), Croxley Green, Watford, Kingston Bagpuize House, North Berkshire (now in Oxfordshire) and Day's House (now Philberd's Manor), East Hanney, Berkshire.
On 23 December 1941, Henry Peregrine Rennie Hoare (1901–1981). They were divorced in 1947.
On 13 November 1947, Lt.-Col. Frederick Wignall (1906–1956). They had one daughter, Caroline Louisa Wignall (born 1948). She was widowed in 1956.
On 25 September 1961, Anthony Marreco (1915–2006), a junior counsel at the Nuremberg Trials, and later a founding director of Amnesty International.

She changed her name back to Wignall by deed poll in 1969 and died in 1982 in Tiverton, Devon. She is buried in the churchyard at All Saints Church, Huntsham close to her father's ancestral seat, Huntsham Court.

Bibliography
Anne Wignall wrote 11 books under two different names:

As Alice Acland
Caroline Norton (Constable, 1948) , a biography of the English social reformer and author
Templeford Park (Constable, 1954) , a tale of country life in contemporary 1950s Britain
A Stormy Spring (Constable, 1955) , a novel set in Sussex, Bruges and Paris, about the life of a fictional young lady, Emily Satersham
A Second Choice (Constable, 1956) , a novel about a young girl in love with a philandering middle-aged married man
A Person of Discretion (Collins, 1958) , story of three sisters from Brussels becoming entangled in the black market and the resistance during the closing stages of the Second World War
The Corsican Ladies (Peter Davies Ltd, 1974) , historical novel based on the extensive autobiographical writings of Laure Junot
The Secret Wife (Peter Davies Ltd, 1975) , a historical novel based on the life of Françoise d'Aubigné
The Ruling Passion (Peter Davies Ltd, 1976) , historical novel based on the life of Diane de Poitiers, a mistress of Henry IV of France

As Anne Marreco
The Charmer and the Charmed (Weidenfeld & Nicolson, 1963) , a comedy of manners, in which the wife of a publisher falls in love with one of her husband's authors
The Boat Boy (Weidenfeld & Nicolson, 1964) , a novel in which the anti-hero brings chaos to rural Ireland
The Rebel Countess – The Life and Times of Constance Markievicz (Weidenfeld & Nicolson, 1967) , a biography of the Irish revolutionary and politician

References

1912 births
1982 deaths
20th-century English novelists
20th-century British women writers
20th-century biographers
English historical novelists
Women historical novelists
English biographers
British socialites
British baronesses
Burials in Devon
Women biographers
20th-century pseudonymous writers
Pseudonymous women writers